Alain Suguenot (born 17 September 1951) is a member of the National Assembly of France.  He represented Côte-d'Or's 5th constituency from 2002 to 2017 as a member of the Union for a Popular Movement.

References

1951 births
Living people
People from Troyes
Sciences Po alumni
Union for a Popular Movement politicians
Deputies of the 12th National Assembly of the French Fifth Republic
Deputies of the 13th National Assembly of the French Fifth Republic
Deputies of the 14th National Assembly of the French Fifth Republic